Euamiana is a genus of moths of the family Noctuidae erected by William Barnes and Foster Hendrickson Benjamin in 1927.

Species
 Euamiana adusta Blanchard & Knudson, 1986
 Euamiana contrasta (Barnes & McDunnough, 1910)
 Euamiana dissimilis (Barnes & McDunnough, 1910)
 Euamiana endopolia (Dyar, 1912)
 Euamiana torniplaga (Barnes & McDunnough, 1916)

References

Hadeninae